Mihara (written: 三原 lit. "three plains") is a Japanese surname. Notable people with the surname include:

, Japanese politician
, Japanese footballer
, better known as Hiroshi Yamato, Japanese professional wrestler
, Japanese politician, singer and actress
Kohei Mihara (disambiguation), multiple people
, Japanese figure skater
, Japanese Magic: the Gathering player
, Japanese judoka
, Japanese footballer
, Japanese film director
, Japanese manga artist
, Japanese footballer
 Puti Kaisar Mihara (born 1986), Austrian model
, Japanese boxer
, Japanese actress
, Japanese model and gravure idol
 Nathan Mihara, Associate Justice of the California Courts of Appeal, 6th District

Japanese-language surnames